Mike Wilkinson (born 15 September 1987) is an English mixed martial artist who most recently competed in the Lightweight division. A professional competitor since 2009, he has competed for the UFC, Absolute Championship Berkut, and was a competitor on The Ultimate Fighter: The Smashes.

Mixed martial arts career

The Ultimate Fighter
In September 2012 it was announced that Wilkinson was selected for The Ultimate Fighter: The Smashes.

Wilkinson had his first fight against Grant Blackler of the Australian team. Wilkinson defeated Blackler in the first round via submission. Leading up to his next fight in the tournament, which was set to be against Colin Fletcher, Wilkinson was injured in training and was replaced by Australian Richie Vaculik. Wilkinson was still given a chance to earn a UFC contract at the Finale.

Ultimate Fighting Championship
Despite getting injured leading up to his second fight on The Ultimate Fighter: The Smashes, Wilkinson was given a fight in the UFC. He faced Brendan Loughnane at UFC on FX 6. Wilkinson was victorious via unanimous decision.

Wilkinson next fought Rony Jason at UFC on Fuel TV 10. Jason defeated Wilkinson by technical submission due to a triangle choke in the first round, giving Wilkinson his first professional MMA loss.

After more than a year out of action, Wilkinson returned to the octagon on 4 October 2014 at UFC Fight Night: Nelson vs. Story and fought Niklas Bäckström. In a significant upset, Wilkinson won the fight via KO due to punches in the first round. The win also earned him his first Performance of the Night bonus award.

Wilkinson was expected to face Alan Omer on 20 June 2015 at UFC Fight Night 69. However, Wilkinson suffered a shoulder injury and was removed from the card.

Wilkinson faced Makwan Amirkhani on 27 February 2016 at UFC Fight Night 84. He lost the fight by unanimous decision and was subsequently released from the promotion.

Absolute Championship Berkut
Wilkinson faced Soso Nizharadze on 15 July 2015 at ACB 41. He lost the fight via unanimous decision.

Wilkinson faced Brendan Loughnane on 11 March 2017 at ACB 53. He lost the fight via TKO in the first round.

Championships and accomplishments

Mixed martial arts
Ultimate Fighting Championship
Performance of the Night (One time)

Mixed martial arts record

|-
|Loss
|align=center|9–5
|David Martinez
|Submission (rear-naked choke)
| |Eternal MMA 42
|
|align=center|3
|align=center|4:17
|Queensland, Australia
|Lightweight bout.
|-
|Loss
|align=center|9–4
|Brendan Loughnane
|KO (knee and punches)
| |ACB 54: Supersonic
|
|align=center|1
|align=center|2:30
|Manchester, England
|
|-
|Loss
|align=center|9–3
|Soso Nizharadze
|Decision (unanimous)
| |ACB 41: The Path to Triumph
|
|align=center|3
|align=center|5:00
|Sochi, Russia
|
|-
|Loss
|align=center|9–2
|Makwan Amirkhani
|Decision (unanimous) 
|UFC Fight Night: Silva vs. Bisping
|
|align=center|3
|align=center|5:00
|London, England
| 
|-
|Win
|align=center|9–1
|Niklas Bäckström
|KO (punches)
|UFC Fight Night: Nelson vs. Story
|
|align=center|1
|align=center|1:19
|Stockholm, Sweden
|
|-
|Loss
|align=center|8–1
|Rony Jason
|Technical Submission (triangle choke)
|UFC on Fuel TV: Nogueira vs. Werdum
|
|align=center|1
|align=center|1:24
|Fortaleza, Brazil
|Featherweight debut.
|-
|Win
|align=center|8–0
|Brendan Loughnane
|Decision (unanimous)
|UFC on FX: Sotiropoulos vs. Pearson
|
|align=center|3
|align=center|5:00
|Gold Coast, Australia
|
|-
|Win
|align=center|7–0
|Brian Moore
|Decision (unanimous)
|OMMAC 12: Bad Vibes
|
|align=center|3
|align=center|5:00
|Liverpool, England
|
|-
|Win
|align=center|6–0
|Artem Lobov
|TKO (punches)
|Raw 1: Enter Colosseum
|
|align=center|2
|align=center|3:52
|Liverpool, England
|
|-
|Win
|align=center|5–0
|Uche Ihiekwe
|TKO (punches)
|OMMAC 9: Enemies
|
|align=center|1
|align=center|4:13
|Liverpool, England
|
|-
|Win
|align=center|4–0
|Craig Allen
|Submission (rear-naked choke)
|Fight Stars 7
|
|align=center|1
|align=center|N/A
|Rotherham, England
|
|-
|Win
|align=center|3–0
|Ali Maclean
|Submission (rear-naked choke)
|OMMAC 5: Showdown
|
|align=center|2
|align=center|1:32
|Liverpool, England
|
|-
|Win
|align=center|2–0
|Neil Spring
|Submission (rear-naked choke)
|OMMAC 4: Victorious
|
|align=center|1
|align=center|3:42
|Liverpool, England
|
|-
|Win
|align=center|1–0
|Tom Clarke
|Submission (armbar)
|OMMAC 1: Assassins
|
|align=center|1
|align=center|4:18
|Liverpool, England
|

See also
 List of current UFC fighters
 List of male mixed martial artists

References

External links
 
 

English male mixed martial artists
1987 births
Featherweight mixed martial artists
Living people
Ultimate Fighting Championship male fighters